"Bye Bye Bye!" is the eighth single by the Japanese idol group Cute. It was released on April 15, 2009, both as a normal CD and a limited edition CD + DVD package. Both editions contained a card with a serial number on it used in a draw, as a promotional event for the single. Since Kanna Arihara was not performing at the time of recording (before later leaving the group without ever having returned), it was the first single without every current member. Maimi Yajima and Airi Suzuki are the lead vocalists. Mai Hagiwara is the minor vocalist and the center. It debuted at number 4 in the Oricon Weekly Singles Chart and remained in the chart for 4 weeks.

Track listing

Charts

References

External links
Bye Bye Bye! at the Up-Front Works discography (Japanese)
Bye Bye Bye! at the Hello! Project official discography

2009 singles
Japanese-language songs
Cute (Japanese idol group) songs
Songs written by Tsunku
Song recordings produced by Tsunku
Zetima Records singles
2009 songs